Larnell is a given name. Notable people with the name include:

Larnell Bruce (died 2016), American murder victim
Larnell Cole (born 1993), English footballer
Larnell Lewis (born 1984), Canadian musician, producer, and educator

Masculine given names